Nenad Mišanović (born June 11, 1984) is a Serbian professional basketball executive and former player.

Playing career 
Mišanović retired as a player with Slodes in April 2021.

Awards and accomplishments
Adriatic League champion: (2005)
Radivoj Korać Cup winner: (2006)

References

External links
 Adriatic League Profile 
 Eurobasket.com Profile 
 Euroleague.net Profile 
 Olsta-bg.com Profile

1984 births
Living people
ABA League players
BC Dynamo Moscow players
Bosnia and Herzegovina expatriate basketball people in Serbia
Centers (basketball)
KK Budućnost players
KK Crvena zvezda players
KK FMP players
KK Hemofarm players
KK Igokea players
KK Radnički Kragujevac (2009–2014) players
KK Slodes players
OKK Beograd players
People from Bileća
Serbian expatriate basketball people in Cyprus
Serbian expatriate basketball people in Montenegro
Serbian expatriate basketball people in Iran
Serbian expatriate basketball people in Poland
Serbian expatriate basketball people in Russia
Serbian expatriate basketball people in Tunisia
Serbian expatriate basketball people in North Macedonia
Serbian men's basketball players
Serbs of Bosnia and Herzegovina